David Parrington (born 28 July 1955) is a Zimbabwean diver. He competed in two events at the 1980 Summer Olympics.

References

External links
 

1955 births
Living people
Zimbabwean male divers
Olympic divers of Zimbabwe
Divers at the 1980 Summer Olympics
People from Wallasey
British emigrants to Rhodesia
White Zimbabwean sportspeople